The Xiluodu Dam is an arch dam on the Jinsha River, i.e. the upper course of the Yangtze in China. It is located near the town of Xiluodu in Yongshan County of Yunnan Province but the dam straddles into Leibo County of Sichuan Province on the opposite side of the river. The primary purpose of the dam is hydroelectric power generation and its power station has an installed capacity of 13,860 MW. Additionally, the dam provides for flood control, silt control and its regulated water releases are intended to improve navigation downstream. Construction on the dam and power station began in 2005 and the first generator was commissioned in 2013, the last in 2014. It is operated by China Yangtze Power and is currently the fourth-largest power station in the world, as well as the fifth tallest dam world-wide.

Location
The Xiluodu Dam is located on the Jinsha (Upper Yangtze) River as it exits the mountainous region of the Hengduan Mountains and Yungui Plateau and enters the Sichuan Basin. This part of the Jinsha flows between the Daliang Mountains in Sichuan on the left (northwest) bank, and the Wulian Feng in Yunnan on the right (southeast) bank.

Background
Preliminary construction (roads, bridges, tunnels) for the dam began in 2003 and work on main structures officially commenced on 26 December 2005. In November 2007, the Jinsha was successfully diverted around the construction site, allowing the dam to be built. Concrete pouring began in 2008. The reservoir was impounded in May 2013 and the first of 18×770 MW Francis turbine-generators was commissioned on 15 July 2013. The fourteenth generator was commissioned in April 2014. The eighteenth and final generator was commissioned on 30 June 2014.

Design
It is the third tallest arch dam in the world and a key component of the Jinsha River Project. The dam contains several spillways to include seven surface outlets, eight mid-level orifices and four spillway tunnels. The dam's power station is split into two underground power stations, one located behind the right abutment, the second behind the left abutment. Each power station contains nine 770 MW Francis turbine-generators for a total installed capacity of 13,860 MW.

See also

 List of power stations in China
 List of tallest dams in the world
 List of tallest dams in China
 List of dams and reservoirs in China
 List of largest power stations in the world

References

External links
 Xiluodu dam under construction in 2013

Hydroelectric power stations in Yunnan
Dams completed in 2013
Dams in China
Dams on the Jinsha River
2014 establishments in China
Arch dams
Hydroelectric power stations in Sichuan
Energy infrastructure completed in 2014
Underground power stations
Buildings and structures in Zhaotong